Ketill Hanstveit (born 2 November 1973) is a retired male triple jumper from Norway. He represented IL Norna-Salhus. His personal best jump was 17.27 metres, achieved in August 1999 in Byrkjelo. This is the current Norwegian record.
 
He finished tenth at the 1992 World Junior Championships in Seoul, eighth at the 1996 European Indoor Championships in Stockholm, twelfth at the 1998 European Championships in Budapest and fifth at the 2000 European Indoor Championships in Ghent. Participating at the 2000 Summer Olympics, he did not manage to reach the final. He became Norwegian champion in the years 1992-1994, 1997-1999 and 2001-2002.

Achievements

References

1973 births
Living people
Norwegian male triple jumpers
Athletes (track and field) at the 2000 Summer Olympics
Olympic athletes of Norway
World Athletics Championships athletes for Norway